Siobhán Ní Shúilleabháin (31 August 1928 – 21 May 2013) was an Irish dramatist and writer.

Biography
Siobhán Ní Shúilleabháin was born in Ballyferriter, County Kerry. She was one of six children of Séamus Ó Súilleabháin and Máire Feiritéar. Her brother was author Mícheál Ó Súilleabháin.

John B. Keane called her the "best dramatist writing in Ireland". Ní Shúilleabháin was the winner of the Irish Life award for plays in 1974, and of thirty Oireachtas literary awards. Her novel Aistriú (2004) led Pól Ó Muirí to write, "[It] is a work of great compassion and poignancy and Ní Shúilleabháin tells the story fluently. Her use of dialogue is particularly impressive, giving the reader the immediate sense of what is said but, magically, also conveying a second meaning behind the spoken one. It is the sound of speech and the whisper of a sigh that adds so much to a wonderful novel."

Her husband, academic Patrick Leo Henry, died in 2011.

Ní Shúilleabháin died in Galway on 21 May 2013, survived by her six children.

Selected works

Children's books
 Triúr Againn, 1955
 Mé Féin agus Síle, 1978
 Rósanna sa Gháirdín, 1994

Novels
 Ospidéal, 1980
 Aistriú, 2004

Plays
 Cití, 1975
 Madge agus Martha, 1976 
 Is Tú mo Mhac, 1990

Plays for television
 Saolaíodh Gamhain, 1971
 An Carabhan, 1972
 Teacht agus Imeacht

Poetry
  Cnuasach Trá, 2000

References

External links

1928 births
2013 deaths
20th-century Irish novelists
21st-century Irish novelists
People from County Kerry
Irish-language writers
Irish women short story writers
20th-century Irish short story writers
Irish women dramatists and playwrights
Irish women novelists
20th-century Irish dramatists and playwrights
21st-century Irish dramatists and playwrights
Irish women screenwriters
21st-century Irish poets
Irish women poets
21st-century Irish women writers
20th-century Irish screenwriters
21st-century Irish screenwriters